Kangaroo Mountain is a low mountain in the Klamath Mountains, in Siskiyou County, far northwestern California.

Geography
The summit marks the southern boundary of the Red Buttes Wilderness which is administered by the Rogue River – Siskiyou National Forest. The Pacific Crest Trail traverses the mountain's southern flank.

It was likely named after the California kangaroo rat.

References

Mountains of Siskiyou County, California
Klamath Mountains
Mountains of Northern California